Toy and Help Yourself are two 1997 Cantonese EPs recorded by Chinese Cantopop singer Faye Wong when she was based in Hong Kong.

In 1996, the last year of her recording contract with Cinepoly Records, Wong recorded ten original songs in Cantonese, all with lyrics by Lin Xi but composed by others such as Wong Ka Keung, Adrian Chan, and Chan Xiao Xia. These songs were supposed to be released as an album in 1996/1997; however, Cinepoly decided to release the ten tracks separately on four occasions.  Cinepoly later released eight of these songs in the two EPs entitled Toy and Help Yourself. The other two songs were included in later compilations.

Toy

Toy (Yale romanization) was released in February 1997, during Faye Wong's parental leave where she gave birth to her first child. The EP's cover photo depicts Wong in her home in Beijing, China, having moved back there after several successful years based in Hong Kong.

The five tracks on Toy would be Wong's most significant release of new Cantonese songs until her self-titled album in 2001.

"" –
 'Undercurrent'
"" –
 'Date/Rendezvous'
"" –
 'Perfunctoriness/Negligence/Equivocation'
"" –
 'Toy/Plaything'
"" –
 'I Believe'

Help Yourself

Help Yourself followed in May 1997.

Although this EP (like Toy) contained new songs, including the hit ballad "On Time", and was welcomed by fans, it received lukewarm critical responses, particularly for the three remixes of songs from earlier albums.

The album cover was a photograph of Faye Wong taken several years previously.

"" –
 'Punctuality/On Time'
"" –
 'Guardian Angel'
"" –
 'Help Yourself'
"Di-Dar" (Historical Remix) –
"" –
 'Pledge/Vow' (Discovery Remix)
"" –
 'Sleepwalk' (Universal Remix)

Other songs
Cinepoly's first releases of their remaining original recordings by Faye Wong were as follows: 
"" - 
 'Unbelievable', on the 1997 compilation Not for Sale (菲賣品)
""
 'Scary', on the 2002 compilation Faye Best

Be Perfunctory

Be Perfunctory is the last Cantonese album by Chinese singer Faye Wong.
In 2015, a fan of Faye Wong purchased the Hong Kong publishing rights from Cinepoly (now under Universal Music Group) and started a company called Chaotic Silence in order to issue the ten tracks together in one album.

"" –
 'Be Perfunctory'
"" –
 'Undercurrent'
"" –
 'Scary'
"" –
 'Guardian Angel'
"" -
 'Punctuality/On Time'
"" -
 'Unbelievable'
"" –
 'Toy/Plaything'
"" –
 'I Believe'
"" –
 'Help Yourself'
"" –
 'Date/Rendezvous'

References

External links
Wun Geui at douban.com 
Wun Geui at mojim.com 
Ji Bin at douban.com 
Ji Bin at mojim.com 

Faye Wong albums
1997 EPs
Cinepoly Records EPs
Cantopop EPs